Tajareh Sadat (also Romanized as Tajareh Sādāt; also known as Tajareh, Tajareh-ye Seyyed, Tajareh-ye Seyyedā, Tāzeh Rah, and Tāzerāh) is a village in Dehpir-e Shomali Rural District, in the Central District of Khorramabad County, Lorestan Province, Iran. At the 2006 census, its population was 289, in 71 families.

References 

Towns and villages in Khorramabad County